Events from the year 2011 in Argentina.

Incumbents
 President – Cristina Fernández de Kirchner
 Vice President – Julio Cobos

Governors
Governor of Buenos Aires Province: Daniel Scioli 
Governor of Catamarca Province: Eduardo Brizuela del Moral (until 10 December); Lucía Corpacci (starting 10 December)
Governor of Chaco Province: Juan Carlos Bacileff Ivanoff 
Governor of Chubut Province: Mario Das Neves (until 10 December); Martín Buzzi (starting 10 December)
Governor of Córdoba: Juan Schiaretti (until 10 December); José Manuel De la Sota (starting 10 December)
Governor of Corrientes Province: Ricardo Colombi 
Governor of Entre Ríos Province: Sergio Urribarri 
Governor of Formosa Province: Gildo Insfrán
Governor of Jujuy Province: Walter Barrionuevo (until 10 December); Eduardo Fellner (starting 10 December)
Governor of La Pampa Province: Óscar Jorge (until 10 December); Celso Jaque (starting 10 December)
Governor of La Rioja Province: Luis Beder Herrera 
Governor of Mendoza Province: Francisco Pérez 
Governor of Misiones Province: Maurice Closs 
Governor of Neuquén Province: Jorge Sapag 
Governor of Río Negro Province: Miguel Saiz (until 10 December); Carlos Ernesto Soria (starting 10 December)
Governor of Salta Province: Juan Manuel Urtubey 
Governor of San Juan Province: José Luis Gioja 
Governor of San Luis Province: Alberto Rodríguez Saá (until 23 December); Claudio Poggi (starting 23 December)
Governor of Santa Cruz Province: Daniel Peralta 
Governor of Santa Fe Province: Hermes Binner (until 11 December); Antonio Bonfatti (starting 11 December)
Governor of Santiago del Estero: Gerardo Zamora
Governor of Tierra del Fuego: Fabiana Ríos 
Governor of Tucumán: José Alperovich

Vice Governors
Vice Governor of Buenos Aires Province: Alberto Balestrini (until 10 December); Gabriel Mariotto (starting 10 December)
Vice Governor of Catamarca Province: Marta Grimaux (until 10 December); Dalmacio Mera (starting 10 December)
Vice Governor of Chaco Province: Juan Carlos Bacileff Ivanoff 
Vice Governor of Corrientes Province: Pedro Braillard Poccard 
Vice Governor of Entre Rios Province: José Lauritto (until 10 December); José Orlando Cáceres (starting 10 December)
Vice Governor of Formosa Province: Floro Bogado 
Vice Governor of Jujuy Province: Pedro Segura (until 10 December); Guillermo Jenefes (starting 10 December)
Vice Governor of La Pampa Province: Luis Alberto Campo (until 10 December); Norma Durango (starting 10 December)
Vice Governor of La Rioja Province: Teresita Luna (until 10 December); Sergio Casas (starting 10 December)
Vice Governor of Misiones Province: Sandra Giménez (until 10 December); Hugo Passalacqua (starting 10 December)
Vice Governor of Neuquén Province: Ana Pechen 
Vice Governor of Rio Negro Province: Bautista Mendioroz (until 10 December); Alberto Weretilneck (starting 10 December)
Vice Governor of Salta Province: Andrés Zottos 
Vice Governor of San Juan Province: Rubén Uñac (until 10 December); Sergio Uñac (starting 10 December)
Vice Governor of San Luis Province: Jorge Luis Pellegrini (until 10 December); Jorge Raúl Díaz (starting 10 December)
Vice Governor of Santa Cruz: Luis Martínez Crespo (until 10 December); Fernando Cotillo (starting 10 December)
Vice Governor of Santa Fe Province: Griselda Tessio (until 10 December); Jorge Henn (starting 10 December)
Vice Governor of Santiago del Estero: Ángel Niccolai 
Vice Governor of Tierra del Fuego: Carlos Basanetti (until 10 December); Roberto Crocianelli (starting 10 December)

Events

January

February

March
 Lucía Corpacci wins the elections for governor of Catamarca.
 The elections for governor of Chubut end in a technical tie; the candidate Carlos Eliceche denounced electoral fraud. Mario Das Neves, governor of Chubut, declines his candidature to the 2011 presidential elections.
 The judiciary of Suiza requests information about truck union leader Hugo Moyano. Moyano calls for a massive strike.

April
 Julio Cobos declines his candidature to run for the presidency of Argentina. Ernesto Sanz does the same a pair of weeks later. Thus, Ricardo Alfonsín is appointed candidate to the presidency for the Radical Civic Union.

May
 Mauricio Macri declines his candidature to run for the presidency of Argentina, running instead for reelection as mayor of Buenos Aires.
 Cristina Fernández choose Daniel Filmus to run for mayor of Buenos Aires.
 A show of the rock band La Renga ends with a death caused by pyrotechnic flare.

June
 River Plate lost a two-ledged match against Belgrano, being relegated to the National B tournament. The second match ends with a massive riot at the Monumental.

July
 Mauricio Macri runs for reelection as mayor of Buenos Aires, getting nearly 47% of the vote. The results call for a runoff election against Daniel Filmus, the second candidate, who got the 27% of the vote.
 Socialist Antonio Bonfatti becomes governor of Santa Fe. Miguel del Sel gets an unexpected second place in the election, leaving the kirchnerist candidate Agustín Rossi in the third place.
 In the Noble siblings case, Marcela and Felipe Noble Herrera (adoptive sons of Ernestina Herrera de Noble) accepted a DNA profiling against a database of disappeared women during the Dirty War. All results are negative, confirming that they were not sons of disappeared women.
 Argentina hosts the 2011 Copa América. The Argentina national football team, however, is defeated early, in a penalty shoot-out against Uruguay.

August

September

October

November

December

Unknown date

Ongoing

Deaths
 January 4 – Gustavo Kupinski, 36, guitarist
 January 10 – María Elena Walsh, 80, musician, poet and writer
 January 12 – Clemar Bucci, 90, racing driver
 February 1 – Julio Barragán, 82, painter
 February 2 – Daniela Castelo, 47, journalist and radio host
 February 20 – Noemí Simonetto de Portela, 85, athlete
 March 5 – Alberto Granado, 88, Argentine-born biochemist and companion of Che Guevara
 March 10 – David Viñas, dramatist, critic, and novelist
 March 12 – Shifra Lerer, 95, Argentine-born actress
 March 20 – Néstor de Vicente, 46, footballer
 March 25 – Hugo Midón, 67, children's literature writer
 April 20 – Osvaldo Miranda, 95, actor
 April 30 – Ernesto Sábato, 99, writer and physicist
 May 6 – Rolo Puente, 71, actor
 May 8 – Carlos Trillo, 68, comic book writer
 June 22 – Carmelo Juan Giaquinta, 81, archbishop
 July 7 – José Carlos Martínez, 48, politician
 July 9 – Facundo Cabral, 74, singer
 August 1 – Florentina Gómez Miranda, 99, teacher and lawyer
 August 12 – Francisco Solano López, 83, comic book artist
 August 15 – Hugo Perié, 67, politician
 August 21 – Ezra Sued, 88, footballer
 November 24 – Antonio Domingo Bussi, 85, military

See also
 List of Argentine films of 2011

External links
 

 
Years of the 21st century in Argentina